Shaul Smadja (born 2 October 1972) is a former Israeli footballer.

He is of a Tunisian-Jewish descent.

Honours
Liga Leumit (1):
2005-06

References

External links
 

1972 births
Living people
Israeli Jews
Association football goalkeepers
Israeli footballers
Hapoel Be'er Sheva F.C. players
Bnei Yehuda Tel Aviv F.C. players
Hapoel Kfar Saba F.C. players
Maccabi Netanya F.C. players
Maccabi Kafr Kanna F.C. players
Maccabi Herzliya F.C. players
Hapoel Ra'anana A.F.C. players
Hapoel Nof HaGalil F.C. players
Maccabi Ironi Bat Yam F.C. players
Beitar Kfar Saba F.C. players
Liga Leumit players
Israeli Premier League players
Israeli people of Tunisian-Jewish descent
Footballers from Dimona